Lazar Solomonovich Minor (17 December 1855 – 1942) was a Russian neurologist who was a native of Vilnius.

Minor received his education at the University of Moscow, where he was a student of Aleksei Kozhevnikov (1836–1902). Afterwards, he worked in Paris under Jean-Martin Charcot (1825–1893), and in Berlin with Carl Otto Westphal (1833–1890) and Emanuel Mendel (1839–1907). In 1884 he became a lecturer of neurology at the University of Moscow, and was later a co-founder of the Moscow Association of Neuropathologists and Psychiatrists.

Minor's name is associated with Minor's disease, a disorder involving a sudden attack of back pain and paralysis caused by hemorrhage into the spinal cord, and also "Minor's sign", a condition in which patients with lower back problems require support of the lower back in order to rise from a seated position. This sign is often indicative of sciatica, sacroiliac lesions or lumbosacral lesions.

Together with Edward Flatau (1868–1932) and Louis Jacobsohn-Lask (1863–1941), he published a textbook on the pathological anatomy of the nervous system called Handbuch der pathologischen Anatomie der Nervensystems.

References 
 all-photo.ru
 diclib.com
 jjew.ru
 Independent Medical Evaluations; Neurological Orthopedic Tests and Evaluations

Russian neurologists
Lithuanian Jews
Physicians from Vilnius
1855 births
1942 deaths